Arthur Melvin Spander is an American sports writer. He is a free-lance columnist for the San Francisco Examiner.

In 1999, he was awarded the McCann Award, earning him a spot in the Pro Football Hall of Fame and in 2007 he was honored with the Masters Major Achievement Award.

Spander began his career as a news writer for United Press International in Los Angeles in 1960, and started writing sports full-time in 1963 for the Santa Monica Outlook where he was the beat writer for the Los Angeles Rams and Los Angeles Dodgers and covered UCLA and USC football and basketball.  In 1965 he moved to the San Francisco Chronicle, where he covered golf, football, baseball and basketball.  Spander became the lead sports columnist for the San Francisco Examiner in 1979.

Spander has covered 50 consecutive Masters Tournaments, 40 Super Bowls, 47 U.S. Open Golf Tournaments, 36 British Open Golf Tournaments, 33 Wimbledons, 20 US Open tennis and 34 Final Fours.  He has also attended 64 consecutive Rose Bowls, initially as a spectator and vendor and the last 54 as a journalist.

In addition to his newspaper work, Spander is a contributor to various sports magazines.  He is also a frequent commentator on sports talk radio.  Spander had a regular gig on ESPN radio in the late 1990s and is often on the Gary Radnich Show on KNBR 680 in San Francisco.

He has also written or co-authored three books:
"Golf The Passion and The Challenge" with Mark Mulvoy, 1977; "The Art Spander Collection", foreword by Al Michaels, 1989, Taylor Publishing; and "Keeping On Course, Golf Tips on Avoiding the Sandtraps of Today's Business World" with Gary Shemano, 1997 McGraw-Hill.
Spander recently wrote the foreword for "The Good, the Bad, and the Ugly Los Angeles Lakers: Heart-Pounding, Jaw-Dropping, and Gut-Wrenching Moments from Los Angeles Lakers History", written by Steve Travers, 2007, Triumph Books.

Born in Los Angeles, CA, Spander is a graduate of Dorsey High School and UCLA.  Spander and his wife Liz reside in Piedmont, Calif.  He has two daughters, Wendy, a publicist for Electronic Arts, and Debbie, a sports and entertainment lawyer in Los Angeles.

Honors and legacy
He was voted "California Sports Writer of the Year" by his peers in 1980. He is the only person to win Golf Writers Association of America first-place awards in each of five decades.

On August 22, 2016, The Tournament of Roses announced Bobby Bell, Ricky Ervins, Tommy Prothro, and Art Spander would be inducted into the Rose Bowl Hall of Fame in the Class of 2016. The Rose Bowl Hall of Fame Induction Ceremony then took place on January 1, 2017, outside the Rose Bowl Stadium, one day before the kickoff of the 103rd Rose Bowl Game on Monday January 2, 2017.

References 

Updated at the time of this year US Open tennis championships.

Living people
Dick McCann Memorial Award recipients
Golf writers and broadcasters
Jewish American writers
People from Los Angeles
University of California, Los Angeles alumni
Sportswriters from California
San Francisco Chronicle people
San Francisco Examiner people
Year of birth missing (living people)
21st-century American Jews